A Man'yō botanical garden is a Japanese form of botanical garden that attempts to contain every species and variety of plant mentioned in the Nara period Man'yōshū poetry anthology. It is somewhat similar to a Shakespeare garden in the English-speaking world.

Specific Man'yō gardens include:

 Akatsuka Botanical Garden
 Futagami Manyo Botanical Gardens
 Michinoku Mano-Manyo Botanical Garden
 Manyo Botanical Garden, Nara

References 

Botanical gardens in Japan